The 1989–90 Temple Owls men's basketball team represented Temple University as a member of the Atlantic 10 Conference during the 1989–90 NCAA Division I men's basketball season. The team was led by head coach John Chaney and played their home games at McGonigle Hall. The Owls won A-10 regular season and conference tournament titles. They received an automatic bid to the NCAA tournament as No. 11 seed in the East region. Temple was beaten by St. John's in the opening round to finish with a record of 20–11 (15–3 A-10).

Roster

Schedule

|-
!colspan=12 style=| Regular season

|-
!colspan=9 style=| Atlantic 10 Tournament

|-
!colspan=9 style=| NCAA Tournament

Rankings

NBA draft

References

Temple Owls men's basketball seasons
Temple
Temple
Temple
Temple